Leslie "Les" Fitton (born 21 November 1964 in Farnworth, Lancashire) is a retired English professional darts player, who played in Professional Darts Corporation events.

Career
Fitton played in one BDO World Darts Championships in 2000, losing 3-2 to Mervyn King in the last 32, and played in four PDC World Darts Championships between 2001 and 2004, reaching the last 16 in 2001 and 2003.

World Championship performances

BDO
 2000: Last 32: (lost to Mervyn King 2–3) (sets)

PDC
 2001: Last 16: (lost to Phil Taylor 1–3)
 2002: Last 32: (lost to John Lowe 1–4)
 2003: Last 16: (lost to Alan Warriner 4–5)
 2004: Last 32: (lost to Dennis Smith 2–4)

References

External links

1964 births
Living people
English darts players
Professional Darts Corporation former pro tour players